Sha'arei Tikva (lit. Gates of Hope) is an Israeli settlement in the West Bank at an elevation of 200 metres. Located northeast of Rosh HaAyin and one kilometre east of the Green Line near Elkana, it is organised as a community settlement and falls under the jurisdiction of Shomron Regional Council.

The international community considers Israeli settlements in the West Bank illegal under international law, but the Israeli government disputes this.

History
According to ARIJ, Israel confiscated land from three nearby Palestinian villages in order to construct Sha'arei Tikva: 
the largest part  were taken from Azzun Atma, which lost 2,689 dunums to Sha'arei Tikva and Oranit,
8 dunams were taken from Mas-ha,
3 dunums were taken from Beit Amin.

Sha'arei Tikva was founded in 1982 by private sale. The first residents moved there in April 1983. The current population is around 6,000 as of January 2017. The village is run by a local committee.

Demography
Sha'arei Tikva is a mixed community of religious and non-religious Jews. It is a dormitory community with most employed people working elsewhere.

Education and culture
In 2012, students from Beit Hinuch Ramon School in Shaarei Tikva held a virtual meeting with age-mates from the Tiferet Israel Hebrew school of Los Angeles to celebrate Israel's 64th Yom Ha'atzmaut.

References

External links
Official website
Sha'arei Tikva Shomron Regional Council 
Menachem Brody's pictures of Sha'arei Tikva

Mixed Israeli settlements
Populated places established in 1983
1983 establishments in the Palestinian territories
Israeli settlements in the West Bank